Kosgama is a small town in Colombo District, Sri Lanka. Located 46 km from Colombo, on the A4 (Colombo - Avissawella) highway, it is also served by the Kelani Valley Railway Line. The town is administered by the Seethawaka Pradeshiya Sabha (Divisional Council).

Populated places in Colombo District